The 2006 Waterloo municipal election took place on November 13, 2006, to elect a mayor, councillors, regional councillors, and school trustees in the city of Waterloo, Ontario, Canada.

Results

Source: 2006 Municipal Election Information, City of Waterloo.

References

2006 Ontario municipal elections
Politics of Waterloo, Ontario